Miss Universe Malaysia 2010, formerly titled Miss Malaysia Universe up until last year, the 44th edition of the Miss Universe Malaysia, was held on 16 May 2010 at Royale Chulan Hotel, Kuala Lumpur. Nadine Thomas of Selangor was crowned by the outgoing titleholder, Joannabelle Ng of Sabah at the end of the event. She then represented Malaysia at the Miss Universe 2010 pageant in Las Vegas, United States.

Results

Special awards

Contestants 
 The official Top 18 finalists of The Next Miss Universe Malaysia 2010.

Crossovers 
Contestants who previously competed/appeared at other national beauty pageants:

Miss Malaysia Indian Global 
 2006 - Mourhrna Anetha Reddy (Winner)

References

External links 

2010
2010 beauty pageants
2010 in Malaysia
Women in Kuala Lumpur